The 1998–99 Florida Panthers season was their sixth season in the National Hockey League. Though they made a major move in acquiring star forward Pavel Bure during the season, the Panthers failed to qualify for the playoffs for the second consecutive season.

Regular season

Final standings

Schedule and results

Player statistics

Awards and records

Transactions

Draft picks
Florida's draft picks at the 1998 NHL Entry Draft held at the Marine Midland Arena in Buffalo, New York.

References
Bibliography
 
 Panthers on Hockey Database

F
F
Florida Panthers seasons
Florida Panthers
Florida Panthers